is a rapid transit station on the Osaka Metro lines in Higashinari-ku, Osaka, Japan.

Lines
Osaka Metro
 (S20)
 (I 21)

Layout
Imazato Station is located under Imazato Junction.  There is an island platform with two tracks for each line, fenced with platform gates.
Sennichimae Line

Imazatosuji Line

Storage tracks for the Sennichimae Line are located in the west and east of the platform, 2 tracks in the west, 1 in the east. The west side tracks were the tracks of Moinomiya Inspection Depot Imazato Branch until Morinomiya Inspection Depot was closed in 2011. The east side track provides space for two 4-car trains.

Surroundings

Public Facilities
Higashinari Ward Office
Higashinari Library

Shopping
Life Corporation Imazato
TSUTAYA Imazato

Others
Imazato Junction (Japan National Route 308 (Nagahori-dori Avenue), Osaka Prefectural Route 702 (Sennichimae-dori Avenue), Imazato-suji Avenue)

References 

Higashinari-ku, Osaka
Osaka Metro stations
Railway stations in Japan opened in 1969